William Edward Voss (born October 31, 1943) is a retired professional baseball player who played eight seasons for the Chicago White Sox, California Angels, Milwaukee Brewers, St. Louis Cardinals, and Oakland Athletics of Major League Baseball. He was traded from the Cardinals to the Cincinnati Reds for Pat Jacquez at the Winter Meetings on November 27, 1972.

Bill graduated from Newport Harbor High School in Newport Beach, CA. in 1961. He then attended Orange Coast College for two years, and then attended Long Beach State College. He was signed as an amateur free agent by the Detroit Tigers in 1963 and then drafted by the Chicago White Sox in the first Major League Baseball draft in 1964.

References

External links

1943 births
Living people
Baseball players from California
Major League Baseball outfielders
Chicago White Sox players
California Angels players
Milwaukee Brewers players
St. Louis Cardinals players
Oakland Athletics players
Hawaii Islanders players
Sportspeople from Glendale, California
Knoxville Smokies players
Lakeland Tigers players
Lynchburg White Sox players
Indianapolis Indians players